Wang Menghan, also known as Tau Tau, is an author and film producer. She was born in Harbin and grew up in Shanghai. She lived in North Africa for many years and now she is living in Berlin.

Introduction 
At the age of 16, she published her first novel, The Ivory Fairytale(), which was based on her life in Shanghai No. 3 girls’ high school. This book was later adapted for the screen and won the national award of Chinese Central Ministry of Culture for TV film and radio drama script. all over the world, she was invited to write columns for periodicals such as The Bund and Shanghai Times. In 2005, she published graphic collections of selective column articles Qing Ren Di Tu() and Ye Ren Bu Luo. Her novel  Foxy() was published in  2008, and Shake Shake, North Africa() in 2011.

She starts to become a filmmaker in 2015, short film Angry Fruits Hotel is written and directed by her. In 2016, she produced the Germany-China co-production feature film Open Wound, which won 21 international film awards including a best producer award in 2017 at Hollywood International Moving Pictures Film Festiva. Her feature debut movie NO ZUO NO DIE, which is written and directed by herself started filming in Hessen, Germany.2019 her new film project WHATEVER SHE WANTS-pinky swear has been launched.

References

Living people
Chinese film producers
Chinese women writers
Year of birth missing (living people)